is a passenger railway station in located in the city of Wakayama, Wakayama Prefecture, Japan, operated by the private railway company Wakayama Electric Railway.

Lines
Idakiso Station is served by the Kishigawa Line, and is located 8.0 kilometers from the terminus of the line at Wakayama Station.

Station layout
The station consists of one island platform connected to the station building by a level crossing. The station is staffed.

Adjacent stations

History
It was renamed  on August 18, 1933 after the nearby Shinto shrine. When the Kishigawa Line's ownership was transferred from Nankai Electric Railway to Wakayama Electric Railway in 2006, the station name was changed to its current name. The only difference between the two is the writing of the third kanji; the pronunciation remains the same. Some of the station's older signage retain the old writing format.

Stationmaster cat 

In January 2007, Kishi Station, the eastern terminus of the Kishigawa Line, named a stray calico cat named Tama as the stationmaster. The cat quickly became the face of the franchise and caused a surge of tourism to the railway line. In February 2012, another stray cat named Nitama (literally "Tama two") was named Tama's apprentice, and was installed as Idakiso Station's stationmaster. Following Tama's death in August 2015, Nitama was reassigned to Kishi Station. In January 2017, another stray cat named Yontama ("literally "Tama four") was named stationmaster at Idakiso Station.

Passenger statistics

Surrounding Area
Wakayama Electric Railway Headquarters
 Idakiso Depot
 Itakiso Shrine

See also
List of railway stations in Japan

References

External links
 
  Idakiso Station timetable

Railway stations in Japan opened in 1916
Railway stations in Wakayama Prefecture
Wakayama (city)